The suprapedal gland or mucous pedal gland is an anatomical feature found in some snails and slugs. It is a gland located inside the front end of the foot of gastropods.

The term suprapedal means "above the foot". 

The function of this gland is to produce mucus. The gland opens on the front end of the sole, on the ventral side of the foot. The mucus produced by this gland becomes a thin layer covering the sole of the foot, and this helps the gastropod in moving.

There are gland cells in the suprapedal gland. For example, in the suprapedal gland of the land snail Pomatias elegans there are three types of gland cells: cells producing mucoproteins, cells producing proteins and cells producing sulphated mucopolysaccharides. For example, the land slug Leidyula floridana has gland cells in the suprapedal gland which produce weakly acidic mucopolysaccharides, neutral mucopolysaccharides and a protein.

References

Further reading 
 Barr R. A. (1926) "Memoirs: Some Observations on the Pedal Gland of Milax". Quarterly Journal of Microscopical Science 70(2): 647-667. abstract, PDF
 Barr R. A. (1927) "Some notes on the mucous and skin glands of Arion ater". Quarterly Journal of Microscopical Science 71: 503-525. PDF
 Borda V., Ramírez R. & Romero P. (2010). "Glándula pediosa de moluscos terrestres y sus implicancias evolutivas, con énfasis en Megalobulimus / Pediose gland in land snails and its evolutionary implications, with emphasis on Megalobulimus." Revista Peruana de Biología 17(1): . 43-52. PDF.
 (April 1972) Biol. Bull. 142: 335-349. (abstract)

Gastropod anatomy
Glands